Carlo Manicone (born 26 January 1998) is a Swiss professional footballer who plays as a forward for Chiasso on loan from Lugano.

Professional career
Manicone began his footballing career Switzerland with Team Ticino, before joining the youth academies of Juventus and Empoli in Italy. After being the player of the tournament for Empoli in the Torneo di Viareggio, on 27 July 2017 Manicone signed a four-year contract with Lugano.

Manicone made his professional debut for Lugano in a 1–0 Swiss Super League to St. Gallen on 16 August 2017. He injured the anterior cruciate ligament of his knee in the last matchday of the 2017–18 season, and was successfully operated requiring a recovery period of 6 months.

On 23 January 2019, Manicone was loaned out to Chiasso for the rest of the season.

On 2 September 2019, he joined Italian club Bisceglie on loan. On 22 January 2020, he moved on another Serie C loan to Pianese. On 6 October 2020, he was loaned to Serie C club Grosseto. On 7 January 2021, he returned to Chiasso on another loan.

Personal life
Manicone is the son of Antonio Manicone, who was also a professional footballer and former international of the Italy national football team.

References

External links
 
 
 FC Lugano Profile
 SFL Profile
 

1998 births
Living people
Sportspeople from Lugano
Swiss men's footballers
Association football forwards
Swiss people of Italian descent
FC Lugano players
FC Chiasso players
A.S. Bisceglie Calcio 1913 players
U.S. Grosseto 1912 players
Swiss Super League players
Serie C players